Fern 'Peachy' Kellmeyer (born February 19, 1944 in West Virginia, United States) is a retired tennis player and current tennis administrator who helped change the face of women's tennis. Kellmeyer is an alumnus of Florida Atlantic University.

A junior champion in the 1950s, Kellmeyer played No. 1 on the University of Miami women's tennis team and became the first woman to compete on a Division 1 men's squad. Hired as physical education director and coach at Florida's Marymount College in 1966, Kellmeyer successfully sued to overturn an AIAW rule barring women's athletic scholarships, leading to Title IX legislation.

In 1973, Kellmeyer was tapped by founder Gladys Heldman as the first tour director of the fledgling Virginia Slims Circuit. She continuously pushed to secure additional venues and increased prize money for players. In 1977, she brought the first women's tennis tournament to Madison Square Garden.

She is the tour operations executive consultant for the Women's Tennis Association.

References

External links
 

American female tennis players
International Tennis Hall of Fame inductees
Florida Atlantic University alumni
Sportspeople from Charleston, West Virginia
Tennis people from West Virginia
1944 births
Living people
21st-century American women